Gender dysphoria (GD) is the distress a person experiences due to a mismatch between their gender identitytheir personal sense of their own genderand their sex assigned at birth. The diagnostic label gender identity disorder (GID) was used until 2013 with the release of the diagnostic manual DSM-5. The condition was renamed to remove the stigma associated with the term disorder.

People with gender dysphoria commonly identify as transgender. Gender nonconformity is not the same thing as gender dysphoria and does not always lead to dysphoria or distress.

The causes of gender incongruence are unknown but a gender identity likely reflects genetic, biological, environmental, and cultural factors. Treatment for gender dysphoria may include supporting the individual's gender expression or their desire for hormone therapy or surgery. Treatment may also include counseling or psychotherapy.

Some researchers and transgender people support declassification of the condition because they say the diagnosis pathologizes gender variance and reinforces the binary model of gender. Without the classification of gender dysphoria as a medical disorder, Hormone replacement therapy (HRT) and gender affirming surgery may be viewed as cosmetic treatments by health insurance, as opposed to medically necessary treatment, and may not be covered.

Signs and symptoms 
Distress arising from an incongruence between a person's felt gender and assigned sex/gender (usually at birth) is the cardinal symptom of gender dysphoria.

A 2018 review published in PLOS Global Public Health found however that gender dysphoria does not reflect sexual orientation or attraction. Another 2018 review published in Adolescent Health, Medicine, and Therapeutics likewise found no relation between sexual orientation and gender dysphoria. A 2021 review in Dialogues in Clinical Neuroscience found no relation either, and stated that historically the two were often erroneously conflated.

According to the British National Health Service, "gender dysphoria is not related to sexual orientation".

According to the American Psychiatric Association, those who experience gender dysphoria later in life "often report having secretly hidden their gender dysphoric feelings from others when they were younger".

Gender dysphoria in those assigned male at birth (AMAB) tends to follow one of two broad trajectories: early-onset or late-onset. Early-onset gender dysphoria is behaviorally visible in childhood. Sometimes gender dysphoria will stop for a while in this group and they will identify as gay or homosexual for a period of time, followed by recurrence of gender dysphoria. A 2016 review in the Archives of Sexual Behavior states this group is usually sexually attracted to members of their natal sex in adulthood, commonly identifying as heterosexual. Late-onset gender dysphoria does not include visible signs in early childhood, but some report having had wishes to be the opposite sex in childhood that they did not report to others. Likewise, according to the review, transgender people assigned male at birth who experience late-onset gender dysphoria will usually be attracted to women and may identify as lesbians or bisexual, while those with early-onset will usually be attracted to men. The review states a similar pattern occurs in those assigned female at birth (AFAB), with those experiencing early-onset GD being most likely to be attracted to women and those with late-onset being most likely to be attracted to men and identify as gay.

Symptoms of GD in children include preferences for opposite sex-typical toys, games, or activities; great dislike of their own genitalia; and a strong preference for playmates of the opposite sex.  Some children may also experience social isolation from their peers, anxiety, loneliness, and depression.  In adolescents and adults, symptoms include the desire to be and to be treated as a different gender. Adults with GD are at increased risk for stress, isolation, anxiety, depression, poor self-esteem, and suicide.  Transgender people are also at heightened risk for eating disorders and substance abuse.

Causes 

The specific causes of gender dysphoria remain unknown, and treatments targeting the etiology or pathogenesis of gender dysphoria do not exist. Evidence from studies of twins suggests that genetic factors play a role in the development of gender dysphoria. Gender identity is thought to likely reflect a complex interplay of biological, environmental, and cultural factors.

Diagnosis 
The American Psychiatric Association permits a diagnosis of gender dysphoria in adolescents or adults if two or more of the following criteria are experienced for at least six months' duration:

 A strong desire to be of a gender other than one's assigned gender
 A strong desire to be treated as a gender other than one's assigned gender
 A significant incongruence between one's experienced or expressed gender and one's sexual characteristics
 A strong desire for the sexual characteristics of a gender other than one's assigned gender
 A strong desire to be rid of one's sexual characteristics due to incongruence with one's experienced or expressed gender
 A strong conviction that one has the typical reactions and feelings of a gender other than one's assigned gender
In addition, the condition must be associated with clinically significant distress or impairment.

The DSM-5 moved this diagnosis out of the sexual disorders category and into a category of its own. The diagnosis was renamed from gender identity disorder to gender dysphoria, after criticisms that the former term was stigmatizing. Subtyping by sexual orientation was deleted. The diagnosis for children was separated from that for adults, as "gender dysphoria in children". The creation of a specific diagnosis for children reflects the lesser ability of children to have insight into what they are experiencing, or ability to express it if they have insight. Other specified gender dysphoria or unspecified gender dysphoria can be diagnosed if a person does not meet the criteria for gender dysphoria but still has clinically significant distress or impairment. Intersex people are now included in the diagnosis of GD.

The International Classification of Diseases (ICD-10) lists several disorders related to gender identity:
 Transsexualism (F64.0): Desire to live and be accepted as a member of the opposite sex, usually accompanied by a desire for surgery and hormonal treatment
 Gender identity disorder of childhood (F64.2): Persistent and intense distress about one's assigned gender, manifested prior to puberty
 Other gender identity disorders (F64.8)
 Gender identity disorder, unspecified (F64.9)
 Sexual maturation disorder (F66.0): Uncertainty about one's gender identity or sexual orientation, causing anxiety or distress

The ICD-11, which came into effect on 1 January 2022, significantly revised classification of gender identity-related conditions. Under "conditions related to sexual health", the ICD-11 lists "gender incongruence", which is coded into three conditions:

 Gender incongruence of adolescence or adulthood (HA60): replaces F64.0
 Gender incongruence of childhood (HA61): replaces F64.2
 Gender incongruence, unspecified (HA6Z): replaces F64.9

In addition, sexual maturation disorder has been removed, along with dual-role transvestism. ICD-11 defines gender incongruence as "a marked and persistent incongruence between an individual's experienced gender and the assigned sex", with no requirement for significant distress or impairment.

Treatment 
Treatment for a person diagnosed with GD may include psychological counseling, supporting the individual's gender expression, or hormone therapy or surgery. This may involve physical transition resulting from medical interventions such as hormonal treatment, genital surgery, electrolysis or laser hair removal, chest/breast surgery, or other reconstructive surgeries.  The goal of treatment may simply be to reduce problems resulting from the person's transgender status, for example, counseling the patient in order to reduce guilt associated with cross-dressing.

Guidelines have been established to aid clinicians. The World Professional Association for Transgender Health (WPATH) Standards of Care are used by some clinicians as treatment guidelines. Others use guidelines outlined in Gianna Israel and Donald Tarver's Transgender Care. Guidelines for treatment generally follow a "harm reduction" model.

Children 

Medical, scientific, and governmental organizations have opposed conversion therapy, defined as treatment viewing gender nonconformity as pathological and something to be changed, instead supporting approaches that affirm children's diverse gender identities. People are more likely to keep having gender dysphoria the more intense their gender dysphoria, cross-gendered behavior, and verbal identification with the desired/experienced gender are (i.e. stating that they are a different gender rather than wish to be a different gender).

Professionals who treat gender dysphoria in children sometimes prescribe puberty blockers to delay the onset of puberty until a child is believed to be old enough to make an informed decision on whether hormonal or surgical gender reassignment is in their best interest. Short-term side effects of puberty blockers include headaches, fatigue, insomnia, muscle aches and changes in breast tissue, mood, and weight. Research on the long-term effects on brain development, cognitive function, fertility, and sexual function is limited.

A review published in Child and Adolescent Mental Health found that puberty blockers are reversible, and that they are associated with such positive outcomes as decreased suicidality in adulthood, improved affect and psychological functioning, and improved social life.

According to the American Psychiatric Association, "Due to the dynamic nature of puberty development, lack of gender-affirming interventions (i.e. social, psychological, and medical) is not a neutral decision; youth often experience worsening dysphoria and negative impact on mental health as the incongruent and unwanted puberty progresses. Trans-affirming treatment, such as the use of puberty suppression, is associated with the relief of emotional distress, and notable gains in psychosocial and emotional development, in trans and gender diverse youth".

In its position statement published December 2020, the Endocrine Society stated that there is durable evidence for a biological underpinning to gender identity and that pubertal suppression, hormone therapy, and medically indicated surgery are effective and relatively safe when monitored appropriately and have been established as the standard of care. They noted a decrease in suicidal ideation among youth who have access to gender-affirming care and comparable levels of depression to cisgender peers among socially transitioned pre-pubertal youth. In its 2017 guideline on treating those with gender dysphoria, it recommends puberty blockers be started when the child has started puberty (Tanner Stage 2 for breast or genital development) and cross-sex hormones be started at 16, though they note "there may be compelling reasons to initiate sex hormone treatment prior to the age of 16 years in some adolescents with GD/gender incongruence". They recommend a multidisciplinary team of medical and mental health professionals manage the treatment for those under 18. They also recommend "monitoring clinical pubertal development every 3 to 6 months and laboratory parameters every 6 to 12 months during sex hormone treatment".

The World Professional Association for Transgender Health's Standards of Care 8, published in 2022, declare puberty blocking medication as "medically necessary", and recommends them for usage in transgender adolescents once the patient has reached Tanner stage 2 of development, and state that longitudinal data shows improved outcomes for transgender patients who receive them. Some medical professionals disagree that adolescents are cognitively mature enough to make a decision with regard to hormone therapy or surgery, and advise that irreversible genital procedures should not be performed on individuals under the age of legal consent in their respective country.

A review commissioned by the UK Department of Health found that there was very low certainty of quality of evidence about puberty blocker outcomes in terms of mental health, quality of life and impact on gender dysphoria. The Finnish government commissioned a review of the research evidence for treatment of minors and the Finnish Ministry of Health concluded that there are no research-based health care methods for minors with gender dysphoria. Nevertheless, they recommend the use of puberty blockers for minors on a case-by-case basis, and the American Academy of Pediatrics state that "pubertal suppression in children who identify as TGD [transgender and gender diverse] generally leads to improved psychological functioning in adolescence and young adulthood.".

In the United States, several states have introduced or are considering legislation that would prohibit the use of puberty blockers in the treatment of transgender children. The American Medical Association, the Endocrine Society, the American Psychological Association, the American Academy of Child and Adolescent Psychiatry and the American Academy of Pediatrics oppose bans on puberty blockers for transgender children. In the UK, in the case of Bell v Tavistock, an appeal court, overturning the original decision, ruled that children under 16 could give consent to receiving puberty blockers. In 2022, the National Board of Health and Welfare in Sweden issued new guidelines recommending that puberty blockers only be given in "exceptional cases" and said that their use was grounded in "uncertain science." Instead, they recommended child psychiatric treatment, psychosocial interventions, and suicide prevention measures to be offered by clinicians.

Psychological treatments 

Until the 1970s, psychotherapy was the primary treatment for gender dysphoria and generally was directed to helping the person adjust to their assigned sex. Psychotherapy is any therapeutic interaction that aims to treat a psychological problem. Psychotherapy may be used in addition to biological interventions, although some clinicians use only psychotherapy to treat gender dysphoria. Psychotherapeutic treatment of GD involves helping the patient to adapt to their gender incongruence or to explorative investigation of confounding co-occurring mental health issues. Attempts to alleviate GD by changing the patient's gender identity to reflect assigned sex have been ineffective and are regarded as conversion therapy by most health organizations.

Biological treatments 

Biological treatments physically alter primary and secondary sex characteristics to reduce the discrepancy between an individual's physical body and gender identity. Biological treatments for GD are typically undertaken in conjunction with psychotherapy; however, the WPATH Standards of Care state that psychotherapy should not be an absolute requirement for biological treatments.

Hormonal treatments have been shown to reduce a number of symptoms of psychiatric distress associated with gender dysphoria. A WPATH commissioned systematic review of the outcomes of hormone therapy "found evidence that gender-affirming hormone therapy may be associated with improvements in [quality of life] scores and decreases in depression and anxiety symptoms among transgender people." The strength of the evidence was low due to methodological limitations of the studies undertaken. Some literature suggests that gender-affirming surgery is associated with improvements in quality of life and decreased incidence of depression. Those who choose to undergo sex reassignment surgery report high satisfaction rates with the outcome, though these studies have limitations including risk of bias (lack of randomization, lack of controlled studies, self-reported outcomes) and high loss to follow up.

For adolescents, much is unknown, including persistence. Disagreement among practitioners regarding treatment of adolescents is in part due to the lack of long-term data. Young people qualifying for biomedical treatment according to the Dutch model (including having GD from early childhood on which intensifies at puberty and absence of psychiatric comorbidities that could challenge diagnosis or treatment) found reduction in gender dysphoria, although limitations to these outcome studies have been noted, such as lack of controls or considering alternatives like psychotherapy.

In its position statement published December 2020, the Endocrine Society stated that there is durable evidence for a biological underpinning to gender identity and that pubertal suppression, hormone therapy, and medically indicated surgery are effective and relatively safe when monitored appropriately and have been established as the standard of care. They noted a decrease in suicidal ideation among youth who have access to gender-affirming care and comparable levels of depression to cisgender peers among socially transitioned pre-pubertal youth. In its 2017 guideline on treating those with gender dysphoria, it recommends puberty blockers be started when the child has started puberty (Tanner Stage 2 for breast or genital development) and cross-sex hormones be started at 16, though they note "there may be compelling reasons to initiate sex hormone treatment prior to the age of 16 years in some adolescents with GD/gender incongruence". They recommend a multidisciplinary team of medical and mental health professionals manage the treatment for those under 18. They also recommend "monitoring clinical pubertal development every 3 to 6 months and laboratory parameters every 6 to 12 months during sex hormone treatment".

A review published in Child and Adolescent Mental Health found that puberty blockers are fully reversible, and that they are associated with such positive outcomes as decreased suicidality in adulthood, improved affect and psychological functioning, and improved social life.

More rigorous studies are needed to assess the effectiveness, safety, and long-term benefits and risks of hormonal and surgical treatments. For instance, a 2020 Cochrane review found insufficient evidence to determine whether feminizing hormones were safe or effective. Several studies have found significant long-term psychological and psychiatric pathology after surgical treatments.

In 2021, a review published in Plastic And Reconstructive Surgery found that less than 1% of people who undergo gender-affirming surgery regret the decision.

Comorbidities 
Among youth, around 20% to 30% of individuals attending gender clinics meet the DSM criteria for an anxiety disorder. Gender dysphoria is also associated with an increased risk of eating disorders in transgender youth.

A widely held view among clinicians is that there is an over-representation of neurodevelopmental conditions amongst individuals with GD, although this view has been questioned due to the low quality of evidence. Studies on children and adolescents with gender dysphoria have found a high prevalence of autism spectrum disorder (ASD) traits or a confirmed diagnosis of ASD. Adults with gender dysphoria attending specialist gender clinics have also been shown to have high rates of ASD traits or an autism diagnosis as well. It has been estimated that children with ASD were over four times as likely to be diagnosed with GD, with ASD being reported from 6% to over 20% of teens referring to gender identity services.

Epidemiology 

Different studies have arrived at different conclusions about the prevalence of gender dysphoria. The DSM-5 estimates that about 0.005% to 0.014% of people assigned male at birth (that is, roughly one in 10,000) and 0.002% to 0.003% of people assigned female at birth (that is, two or three in every 100,000) are diagnosable with gender dysphoria.

According to Black's Medical Dictionary, gender dysphoria "occurs in one in 30,000 male births and one in 100,000 female births." Studies in European countries in the early 2000s found that about 1 in 12,000 natal male adults and 1 in 30,000 natal female adults seek out sex reassignment surgery. Studies of hormonal treatment or legal name change find higher prevalence than sex reassignment, with, for example a 2010 Swedish study finding that 1 in 7,750 adult natal males and 1 in 13,120 adult natal females requested a legal name change to a name of the opposite gender.

Studies that measure transgender status by self-identification find even higher rates of gender identity different from sex assigned at birth (although some of those who identify as transgender or gender nonconforming may not experience clinically significant distress and so do not have gender dysphoria). A study in New Zealand found that 1 in 3,630 natal males and 1 in 22,714 natal females have changed their legal gender markers.  A survey of Massachusetts adults found that 0.5% identify as transgender. A national survey in New Zealand of 8,500 randomly selected secondary school students from 91 randomly selected high schools found 1.2% of students responded "yes" to the question "Do you think you are transgender?". Outside of a clinical setting, the stability of transgender or non-binary identities is unknown.

Research indicates people who transition in adulthood are up to three times more likely to be male assigned at birth, but that among people transitioning in childhood the sex ratio is close to 1:1. The prevalence of gender dysphoria in children is unknown due to the absence of formal prevalence studies.

History 
Neither the DSM-I (1952) nor the DSM-II (1968) contained a diagnosis analogous to gender dysphoria. Gender identity disorder first appeared as a diagnosis in the DSM-III (1980), where it appeared under "psychosexual disorders" but was used only for the childhood diagnosis. Adolescents and adults received a diagnosis of transsexualism (homosexual, heterosexual, or asexual type). The DSM-III-R (1987) added "Gender Identity Disorder of Adolescence and Adulthood, Non-Transsexual Type" (GIDAANT). DSM-V (2013) replaced gender identity disorder (GID) with gender dysphoria (GD) to avoid the stigma of the term disorder.

Society and culture 

Researchers disagree about the nature of distress and impairment in people with GD. Some authors have suggested that people with GD suffer because they are stigmatized and victimized; and that, if society had less strict gender divisions, transgender people would suffer less.

Some controversy surrounds the creation of the GD diagnosis, with Davy et al. stating that although the creators of the diagnosis state that it has rigorous scientific support, "it is impossible to scrutinize such claims, since the discussions, methodological processes, and promised field trials of the diagnosis have not been published."

Some cultures have three or more defined genders.  The existence of accepted social categories other than man or woman may alleviate the distress associated with cross-gender identity. For example, in Samoa, the fa'afafine, a group of feminine males, are mostly socially accepted. The fa'afafine appear similar to transgender women in terms of their lifelong identities and gendered behavior, but experience far less distress than do transgender women in Western cultures. This suggests that the distress of gender dysphoria is mostly not caused by the cross-gender identity itself, but by difficulties encountered from social disapproval by one's culture. Overall, it is unclear whether or not gender dysphoria persists in cultures with third gender categories.

Classification as a disorder 
The psychiatric diagnosis of gender identity disorder (now gender dysphoria) was introduced in DSM-III in 1980. Arlene Istar Lev and Deborah Rudacille have characterized the addition as a political maneuver to re-stigmatize homosexuality. (Homosexuality was declassified as a mental disorder in the DSM-II in 1974.) By contrast, Kenneth Zucker and Robert Spitzer argue that gender identity disorder was included in DSM-III because it "met the generally accepted criteria used by the framers of DSM-III for inclusion." Some researchers, including Spitzer and Paul J. Fink, contend that the behaviors and experiences seen in transsexualism are abnormal and constitute a dysfunction. The American Psychiatric Association stated that gender nonconformity is not the same thing as gender dysphoria, and that "gender nonconformity is not in itself a mental disorder. The critical element of gender dysphoria is the presence of clinically significant distress associated with the condition."

Individuals with gender dysphoria may or may not regard their own cross-gender feelings and behaviors as a disorder. Advantages and disadvantages exist to classifying gender dysphoria as a disorder. Because gender dysphoria had been classified as a disorder in medical texts (such as the previous DSM manual, the DSM-IV-TR, under the name "gender identity disorder"), many insurance companies are willing to cover some of the expenses of sex reassignment therapy. Without the classification of gender dysphoria as a medical disorder, sex reassignment therapy may be viewed as a cosmetic treatment, rather than medically necessary treatment, and may not be covered. In the United States, transgender people are less likely than others to have health insurance, and often face hostility and insensitivity from healthcare providers. Gender dysphoria being a disorder also means it is covered by the Americans with Disabilities Act, which may aid transgender people in accessing legal protections they otherwise may be unable to. Some researchers and transgender people support declassification of the condition because they say the diagnosis pathologizes gender variance and reinforces the binary model of gender.

An analysis of the Samoan third gender fa'afafine suggests that the DSM-IV-TR diagnostic component of distress is not inherent in the cross-gender identity; rather, it is related to social rejection and discrimination suffered by the individual. Psychology professor Darryl Hill insists that gender dysphoria is not a mental disorder, but rather that the diagnostic criteria reflect psychological distress in children that occurs when parents and others have trouble relating to their child's gender variance. Transgender people have often been harassed, socially excluded, and subjected to discrimination, abuse and violence, including murder.

In December 2002, the British Lord Chancellor's office published a Government Policy Concerning Transsexual People document that categorically states, "What transsexualism is not ... It is not a mental illness." In May 2009, the government of France declared that a transsexual gender identity will no longer be classified as a psychiatric condition, but according to French trans rights organizations, beyond the impact of the announcement itself, nothing changed. Denmark made a similar statement in 2016.

In the ICD-11, GID is reclassified as "gender incongruence", a condition related to sexual health. The working group responsible for this recategorization recommended keeping such a diagnosis in ICD-11 to preserve access to health services.

Gender euphoria 

Gender euphoria (GE) is a term for the satisfaction, enjoyment, or relief felt by trans and non-binary people when they feel their gender expression matches their personal gender identity. Healthline defines it as "feelings of alignment or joy about [one's] gender identity or expression," while Psych Central definition is "deep joy when your internal gender identity matches your gender expression." It is proposed that feelings of gender euphoria require societal acceptance of gender expression. In academics and the medical field, a consensus has not yet been reached on a precise definition of the term, as it has been mainly used within a social context. The first attempt to rigorously define gender euphoria through an online survey took place in 2021, conducted by Will Beischel, Stéphanie Gauvin, and Sari van Anders. Transgender congruence is also used to ascribe transgender individuals feeling genuine, authentic, and comfortable with their gender identity and external appearance.

The term gender euphoria has been used by the transgender community since at least the mid-1970s. Originally, it referred to the feeling of joy arising from fulfilling a mix of gender roles, which was different from the concept of gender dysphoria, which is used to describe individuals who wished to medically transition to a different sex. In the 1980s, the term was published in trans contexts, coming up in interviews with trans people. For example, in a 1988 interview with a trans man, the subject states, "I think that day [Dr. Charles Ilhenfeld] administered my first shot of the 'wonder-drug' must have been one of the 'peak-experiences' of my life -- talk about 'gender euphoria'!" The interview indicates he is referring to testosterone.

Others figures, including Mariette Pathy Allen and Virginia Prince have used the term in their work. In 1990, Virginia Prince used the phrase in trans magazine Femme Mirror, ending an article with, "...from here on you can enjoy GENDER EUPHORIA - HAVE A GOOD LIFE!" Starting in 1991, a monthly newsletter named Gender Euphoria was released, featuring articles about transgender topics; Leslie Feinberg read the newsletter to better understand the transgender community. However, there are instances in which gender euphoria has been used with a different meaning, such as in 1979, when the Black feminist Michele Wallace used it to describe the male privilege present in Black men.

The term has been embraced as part of a movement to stop pathologizing being transgender. In 1989, Mariette Pathy Allen published an unnamed transgender person's quote in her photography book Transformations: "The shrinks may call it 'gender dysphoria,' but for some of us, it's gender 'euphoria,' and we're not going to apologize anymore!" In 1997, Patrick Califia described transgender activists picketing using signs that read "Gender Euphoria NOT Gender Dysphoria" and handing out "thousands of leaflets" at protests. The following year, in 1998, Second Skins: The Body Narratives of Transsexuality reported:

Similarly, Florence Ashley has advocated for the medical field to focus on helping patients achieve gender euphoria, instead of treating patients on the basis of gender dysphoria. They argue that currently, in order for individuals to receive gender-affirming care they must be diagnosed with gender dysphoria, which is not always accessible and entails people must be experiencing significant distress before they can fully express their own gender identity. Ashley's stance that gender euphoria does not need to be preceded by a clinical diagnosis of gender dysphoria, and that gender euphoria is complex, is echoed by Elliot Tebbe and Stephanie Budge in their 2022 Nature Reviews Psychology article, in which they write, "Gender euphoria is not merely the absence of gender dysphoria, but rather a conglomeration of positive emotions and subjective well-being in response to being affirmed in one’s gender." The movement to focus on the positive side of gender expression was also advocated for in 1994, when the Scottish "TV/TS" periodical The Tartan Skirt wrote, "Let's accentuate the positive, discard the negative, and promote the new condition of 'Gender Euphoria.'"

Gender euphoria has also been expressed through art. In 2019, the Midsumma festival in Australia hosted "Gender Euphoria," a cabaret focusing on "bliss" in transgender experiences, including musical, ballet, and burlesque performances. A reviewer described it as "triumphant – honest, unpretentious, touching, and a vital celebration." Moreover, photography in the East Village in Manhattan has served as means to express gender euphoria, contrasting fashion photography, which is said to reinforce the gender binary.

See also 
 List of transgender-related topics
 Transmedicalism
 Gender transitioning
 Detransition

References

Further reading 

 
 
 
 
  Includes a description of ICD-10 criteria.

External links 
 Health Law Standards of Care for Transsexualism – An alternative to the Benjamin Standards of Care proposed by the International Conference on Transgender Law and Employment Policy.
 The Lord Chancellor's Department Government Policy concerning Transsexual People

Gender identity
Transgender and medicine